Kathleen C. Keenan (born May 7, 1940) is an American politician in the state of Vermont. She is a member of the Vermont House of Representatives, sitting as a Democrat from the Franklin 3-1 district, having been first elected in 1988.

References

1940 births
Living people
Politicians from Burlington, Vermont
People from St. Albans, Vermont
Democratic Party members of the Vermont House of Representatives
Women state legislators in Vermont
21st-century American politicians
21st-century American women politicians